Peter Gibbons (born July 9, 1962) is a Canadian former stock car racing driver. He was the champion of the CASCAR Super Series in 1999 and 2000.

Racing career
Gibbons competed in 81 CASCAR Super Series events, with 17 wins, 40 Top-5, 59 Top-10 and 8 pole-positions and 2 championships (1999 and 2000). He also competed in 25 CASCAR East Series events and had 3 wins, 13 Top-5, 14 Top-10 and 5 pole-positions. He was the runner-up in the 2000 season. Gibbons competed in 4 CASCAR West Series events, with 2 Top-5 and 4 Top-10.

He competed in two NASCAR Busch Series events and failed to qualify in other four races. He also attempted one NASCAR Craftsman Truck Series event but failed to qualify. He competed in 12 events of the NASCAR North Tour and in 25 events in NASCAR Canadian Tire Series.

Gibbons also competed in 10 ARCA Racing Series events and failed to qualify for one race.

Motorsports career results

NASCAR
(key) (Bold – Pole position awarded by qualifying time. Italics – Pole position earned by points standings or practice time. * – Most laps led.)

Busch Series

Craftsman Truck Series

References

External links
 

Racing drivers from Ontario
1962 births
Living people
Canadian racing drivers
NASCAR drivers
ARCA Menards Series drivers
CASCAR Super Series drivers